The First Christian Church in Corbin, Kentucky is a historic Christian Church at S. Kentucky and W. First Street. It was built in 1925 and added to the National Register of Historic Places in 1986.

Its building is a two-story (20 foot) brick Classical Revival-style building with brick laid in Flemish bond, with brick pilasters and a two-story pedimented portico.

References

Churches on the National Register of Historic Places in Kentucky
Corbin, Kentucky
Neoclassical architecture in Kentucky
Churches completed in 1925
20th-century churches in the United States
National Register of Historic Places in Whitley County, Kentucky
Neoclassical church buildings in the United States
1925 establishments in Kentucky